Monte Due Mani is a mountain of Lombardy, Italy, with an elevation of .
 

Mountains of the Alps
Mountains of Lombardy